Étienne Jérôme Rouchouze SS.CC. (Chazeau, Loire 1798–1843 at sea) was a French Catholic missionary in the Eastern Pacific.

Biography 
A member of the Congregation of the Sacred Hearts of Jesus and Mary, he was appointed by the Holy See Vicar Apostolic and Titular Bishop of Nilopolis from 1833 to 1843 of the Vicariate Apostolic of Oriental Oceania, from which were derived the Archdiocese of Papeete, the Diocese of Honolulu and the Diocese of Taiohae or Tefenuaenata in the Marquesas Islands. As a missionary bishop, Msgr. Rouchouze resided in Valparaíso, Chile and in Honolulu; he was responsible for the evangelization efforts of the Picpus Fathers in the Hawaiian Islands and eastern Pacific. His motto was Per aspera in astera (from hardship to the stars).

Prior to his episcopal ministry, Pope Gregory XVI, on 27 November 1825, created the Prefecture Apostolic of the Sandwich Islands.  Father Alexis Bachelot was subsequently appointed its first prefect on 3 December 1825.

Msgr. Rouchouze was appointed Vicar Apostolic of Eastern Oceania and Titular Bishop of Nilopolis on 14 June 1833 with ordinary jurisdiction over the Hawai‘i prefecture apostolic.  He was subsequently consecrated to the episcopate in Rome, on 22 December 1833 by the Prefect of the Propaganda Fide, Cardinal Carlo Maria Pedicini. On 29 June 1834, in Golden Square in London, Msgr. Rouchouze served as principal co-consecrator in the episcopal ordination of Msgr. John Bede Polding, O.S.B., Titular Bishop of Hierocaesarea and Vicar Apostolic elect of New Holland.

Rouchouze left Le Havre on 29 October 1834 and arrived in Valparaíso, Chile on 19 February 1835. After staying a few months, he went on to  Mangareva in the Gambier Islands on 9 May 1835. He baptized the island's king Maputeoa and his family on 25 August 1836. On 4 April 1839, Msgr. Rouchouze returned to blessed the first stone for the St. Michael's Cathedral, Rikitea in Mangareva. He said the first pontifical Mass in the Marquesas at Tahuata on 6 February 1839. He arrived in Honolulu on 14 May 1840.

On 8 December 1842 the ship Marie-Joseph was blessed in Saint Malo in Brittany. Shortly thereafter, Msgr. Rouchouze, accompanied by six priests, one sub-deacon, seven lays brothers and ten sisters, left Saint Malo for Oceania on the Marie-Joseph. Sister Caliste Le Gris died at sea. Unwilling to bury her at sea, they put into Island of Saint Catherine near Florianópolis in Brazil and buried her there. On 19 February 1843 Rouchouze and his remaining missionaries left the island. Evaristo, a Mangarevan youth, fell ill and also died while they were in Brazil. The ship was last sited off the Falkland Islands on 13 March 1843. Rouchouze and his companions were never seen again and were presumed to have perished at sea.

See also 

 Catholic Church hierarchy
 List of missionaries to Hawaii
 Lists of patriarchs, archbishops, and bishops
 Roman Catholic Bishop of Honolulu

Sources and References 

 GCatholic

Bibliography

Episcopal succession 

Roman Catholic bishops of Honolulu
Picpus Fathers
French Roman Catholic missionaries
People from Firminy
1843 deaths
Deaths due to shipwreck at sea
1798 births
Roman Catholic missionaries in French Polynesia
Roman Catholic missionaries in Chile
French expatriates in Chile
Roman Catholic missionaries in Hawaii
19th-century American Roman Catholic priests